The Hamburg Express class is a series of 10 container ships built for Hapag-Lloyd. The ships were built by Hyundai Heavy Industries in South Korea. The ships have a maximum theoretical capacity of 13,177 TEU.

List of ships

See also 
Valparaiso Express-class container ship

References 

Container ship classes
Ships built by Hyundai Heavy Industries Group